KHBC (92.7 FM) is a radio station  broadcasting a Hot AC format. Licensed to Hilo, Hawaii, United States, the station is currently owned by Australia-based Resonate Broadcasting.

History
The station went on the air as KHHI on 1989-05-25. On 1991-12-16, the station changed its call sign to KAOE, on 1996-08-07 to DKAOE, on 1996-12-19 to KHWI, on 2009-05-11 to KIPA, and on 2009-05-22 to the current KHBC.

References

External links
Station website

HBC
Radio stations established in 1989
1989 establishments in Hawaii
Hot adult contemporary radio stations in the United States
Adult top 40 radio stations in the United States
Resonate Broadcasting